Geneviève Simard (born November 5, 1980) is a Canadian alpine skier. She has appeared in two Winter Olympics, in 2002 and 2006. She is now a world-famous helicopter pilot featured in Hélico tous terrains, a Quebec TV show about a bush helicopter pilot working in Quebec's north coast.

Olympics

2006
Finished 20th in the super-G
Finished 5th in the giant slalom

2002
Finished 18th in the super-G
Finished 7th in the combined

World championships
Simard raced in the World Championships in 1999, 2003, 2005 and 2007. Her best finish was fourth in the 2003 super-G.

World Cup
Since making her World Cup debut in November 1998, Simard has won one race, on January 14, 2004, in a super-G race in Cortina d'Ampezzo in Italy.

References
Olympic profile

External links
 
 
 
 
 

1980 births
Canadian female alpine skiers
Alpine skiers at the 2002 Winter Olympics
Alpine skiers at the 2006 Winter Olympics
Olympic alpine skiers of Canada
Helicopter pilots
Skiers from Montreal
Living people